Spring Ranch is a ghost town in Clay County, Nebraska, in the United States.

History
A post office was established at Spring Ranch (also spelled historically Springranch) in 1870, and remained in operation until it was discontinued 1943.

References

Geography of Clay County, Nebraska